Ernő Béres (born 30 July 1928) is a Hungarian former long-distance runner who competed in the 1952 Summer Olympics. He was born in Miskolc.

References

External links
 

1928 births
Living people
Hungarian male long-distance runners
Hungarian male middle-distance runners
Olympic athletes of Hungary
Athletes (track and field) at the 1952 Summer Olympics
Sportspeople from Miskolc
20th-century Hungarian people